Ortego is a surname. Notable people with the surname include:

Keith Ortego (born 1963), American football player
Miguel Ortego (born 1964), Spanish field hockey player 
Artie Ortego  (1890–1960), American film actor
Stephen Ortego (born 1984), American politician

See also
Ortega